TV4 HD may refer to:
TV4 HD (Sweden)
TV4 HD (Poland), a planned Polish private television station

See also
 Television in Sweden
 Television in Poland
 Lists of television channels